Kamen Rider Build is a Japanese tokusatsu drama in Toei Company's Kamen Rider series. It is the nineteenth series in the Heisei period run and the twenty-eighth series overall. The series tells the story of a genius physicist with no memories apart from a "bat man" who secretly fights as a Kamen Rider in an alternate-universe Japan, which has been divided into three by the mysterious Pandora's Box artifact and overrun by monsters called Smash. It premiered on TV Asahi on September 3, 2017.

Similar to the previous series, half of each episode's title is an English word, though spelled in katakana instead of English letters, and the other is written in kanji. Also, each episode briefly shows mathematics and/or physics formulas, which forms the episode number.

Episodes

References

External links

Build
Kamen Rider Build